Mahi V Raghav is an Indian film maker, screenwriter and producer known for his works in Telugu cinema. He is notable for directing Anando Brahma, a comedy horror and Yatra, a biopic of YS Raja Sekhar Reddy, late CM of Andhra Pradesh.

He started his film career as a producer and went on to become a screenwriter and director with the films Pathasala, Anando Brahma and Yatra.

Early life
Mahi is an MBA graduate from Madras University. Before getting into the film industry, he has taken up multiple jobs in the UK and New Zealand. After returning to India in 2008, he assisted Sai Kiran Adivi in Vinayakudu, the film that also started his career as a producer in the film industry.

Film career
Mahi V Raghav began his career as a producer for Villagelo Vinayakudu with Moonwater Pictures Production Company. The production house has funded three films altogether. In 2014, he has written and directed the third film of Moonwater Pictures, Pathasala; prospecting his love for films.

After the critically acclaimed Pathasala, he directed the comedy horror, Anando Brahma with Taapsee Pannu, Vennela Kishore and Shakalaka Shankar in 2017. Bankrolled by 70mm Entertainments, Anando Brahma broke all the clichés of the horror comedies and did well with the audience. The film has been remade as Petromax in Tamil and Mane Maratakkide in Kannada.

In 2019, he made Yatra, the biographical film of the Late Chief Minister Mr.Y.S. Rajasekhara Reddy under 70mm Entertainments and Three Autumn Leaves. Mammootty played the lead in the film as YSR, with the plot based on real incidents that led him to the Padhayatra which later made him the Chief Minister of Andhra Pradesh in 2004. The phrase 'Nenu vinnanu, Nenu unnanu" written by Mahi has been used as a campaign slogan by the YSR Congress Party during the 2019 Andhra Pradesh Legislative Assembly election. It also has been titled to the book written on the political campaigns of Y. S. Jaganmohan Reddy, the Current Chief Minister of Andhra Pradesh. His current project is a social satire with the actress Shraddha Srinath and also hails a range of comedians in the same. The film is titled Sidda Lokam Ela Undhi Nayna and is to release mid year in 2022. His other projects lined up is a crime drama with a premium web platform and Yatra 2.

Three autumn leaves
With Yatra, Mahi V Raghav has announced his new production house – Three Autumn Leaves. From feature films to web series and from brand stories to documentaries, Three Autumn Leaves loves to partner with a wide range of craftsmen. It visions to transcend language, genre, geography, and money to purely nurture the essence of story-telling. Instead of practicing the conventional way of funding the projects, Three Autumn Leaves funds the content while it's still on the paper.

Filmography

Awards and nominations

References

External links
 

Telugu film producers
Living people
Telugu film directors
Telugu screenwriters
1984 births